Barangay Apo is the fourteenth studio album of the Filipino trio Apo Hiking Society. It's a 9-track album released in 1993 under Universal Records.

Track listing
Kating-kati at Di Mapakali (3:03)
Alam Niya (3:29)
Todo Bigay (4:23)
Consuelo (2:27)
Mamahalin Kita (3:26)
Suntok sa Buwan (4:16)
Sorry! (3:40)
Sa Liham Na Lang (4:36)
Nadale Na Naman (4:00)

Related links
The Official Apo Hiking Society Website 

APO Hiking Society albums
1994 albums